Derriwong is a rural locality in Cunningham County, one of the Lands administrative divisions of New South Wales, Australia.

In 2016 it had a population of 38.

It is also a station on the Sydney - Broken Hill railway line.
Although mainly agricultural in character, the locality is notable as being the geographic centre of New South Wales, by one calculation.

(See Also Mount Tilga.)

References

Towns in New South Wales
Towns in the Central West (New South Wales)